Meeuwis is a Dutch patronymic surname, originally meaning "son of Meeuw/Mewis", short forms of Bartholomeus/Bartholomew. Notable people with the surname include:

 Guus Meeuwis (born 1972), Dutch singer-songwriter
 Marcel Meeuwis (born 1980), Dutch footballer
 Martijn Meeuwis (born 1982), Dutch baseball player

See also
Meeuw

References

Dutch-language surnames
Patronymic surnames